The Makemakes is the debut studio album by Austrian pop rock band The Makemakes. It was released in Austria on 13 May 2015, through Almost Perfecto Records. The album peaked at number 20 on the Austrian Albums Chart. The album includes the single "I Am Yours".

Singles
"I Am Yours" was released as the lead single from the album on 5 March 2015. On 13 March 2015, the Makemakes were chosen to represent Austria in the Eurovision Song Contest 2015. The song was selected through a national final organised by the Austrian broadcaster Österreichischer Rundfunk (ORF). Austria was automatically qualified to compete in the finals on 23 May 2015 due to Austria being the host nation (due to their win in the previous year). They tied with Germany for last place with zero points.

Track listing

Charts

Release history

References

2015 debut albums
The Makemakes albums